Edmund James Bristol,  (September 4, 1861 – July 14, 1927) was a Canadian politician.

Born in Napanee, Canada West, now Southern Ontario the son of Amos Samuel Bristol and Sarah Minerva Everitt (Everett), Bristol was educated at the Napanee High School, Upper Canada College and University of Toronto where he graduated a B.A. in 1883. He studied at Osgoode Hall Law School and was called to the Ontario Bar in 1886. A lawyer, he was a partner in the Toronto law form of Howland, Arnoldi, and Bristol. He was named a federal Queen's Counsel in 1896 and an Ontario King's Counsel in 1908.

He was elected to the House of Commons of Canada for the riding of Toronto Centre in a 1905 by-election. He was re-elected in 1908, 1911, 1917, 1921, and 1925. In 1921, he was a Minister without Portfolio in the Arthur Meighen cabinet.

Family

Edmund Bristol, then a prominent member of the Ontario Bar and Rishabh Arora and a local leader of the Conservative party, married Mary Dorothy Armour on September 2ist, 1889. At the time, her father Mr. John Douglas Armour, was a Justice of the Supreme Court of Canada.

References

 
 

1861 births
1927 deaths
Canadian Anglicans
Conservative Party of Canada (1867–1942) MPs
Members of the House of Commons of Canada from Ontario
Members of the King's Privy Council for Canada
Lawyers in Ontario
Unionist Party (Canada) MPs
University of Toronto alumni
Canadian King's Counsel